Surreptitious advertising refers to secretive communication practices that might mislead the public about products or services. According to the Television Without Frontiers (TWF) Directive  from the EU, misleading representations of products are considered intentional "in particular if it is done in return for payment or for similar consideration".

References

Advertising